Sergio Adolfo Govi (30 June 1934 – 31 May 2016) was a Roman Catholic bishop.

Ordained to the priesthood in 1960, Govi served as coadjutor bishop of the Roman Catholic Diocese of Bossangoa, Central African Republic from 1975 to 1978. He then served as bishop of the diocese from 1978 to 1995.

See also

Notes

1934 births
2016 deaths
20th-century Roman Catholic bishops in the Central African Republic
Roman Catholic bishops of Bossangoa